Leptobrachium ingeri is a species of frog in the family Megophryidae from Borneo. It was recently distinguished as a separate species from within the Leptobrachium nigrops species complex.

References

ingeri
Amphibians of Borneo
Frogs of Asia
Amphibians described in 2012